The Twelve Jewels of Islam in the Nation of Gods and Earths is a variant of the Supreme Alphabet and Supreme Mathematics that the group's members use to understand the meaning of the universe. All three systems comprise the Universal Language. These jewels are also shared by The Nation of Islam.

The twelve principles
 Knowledge
 Wisdom
 Understanding
 Freedom
 Justice
 Equality
 Food
 Clothing
 Shelter
 Love
 Peace
 Happiness

References 

Five-Percent Nation